Srikrishna College, (Bengali : শ্রীকৃষ্ণ কলেজ) established in 1952, is a college in Bagula, in Nadia district in the state of West Bengal. It offers undergraduate courses in arts, commerce and sciences. It is affiliated to  University of Kalyani.

History

Departments

Science
Chemistry
Computer Science
Physics
Mathematics

Arts and Commerce
Bengali
English
History
Geography
Political Science
Philosophy
Economics
Commerce

Accreditation
Srikrishna College was awarded a B+ grade by the National Assessment and Accreditation Council (NAAC). The college is recognized by the University Grants Commission (UGC).

See also

References

External links

Srikrishna College
University of Kalyani
University Grants Commission
National Assessment and Accreditation Council

Colleges affiliated to University of Kalyani
Educational institutions established in 1952
Universities and colleges in Nadia district
1952 establishments in West Bengal